Morgan Smithies (born 7 November 2000) is a professional rugby league footballer who plays as a  and  forward for the Wigan Warriors in the Super League and the England Knights at international level.

Background
Smithies was born in Halifax, West Yorkshire, England. Brought up within a farming background and loves to shear sheep in his free time.

Career
In 2019 he made his Super League début for Wigan against the Catalans Dragons.
He played in the 2020 Super League Grand Final which Wigan lost 8-4 against St Helens.
On 28 May 2022, Smithies played for Wigan in their 2022 Challenge Cup Final victory over Huddersfield.
On 1 June 2022, Smithies was banned for four matches over two dangerous high tackles which occurred during Wigan's Challenge Cup final win.

International career
In 2019 he was selected for the England Knights against Jamaica at Headingley Rugby Stadium.

References

External links
Wigan Warriors profile
SL profile

2000 births
Living people
English rugby league players
Rugby league second-rows
Rugby league players from Halifax, West Yorkshire
Wigan Warriors players